Myrcia attenuata is a species of plant in the family Myrtaceae, endemic to French Guiana, and first described in 2015.

Etymology 
The species name refers to the rare shape of the base of the fruit.

Description 
Myrcia attenuata is a tree that grows to between 4 and 25 metres tall. Leaves grow up to 14.7cm long and 4.6cm wide. Fruits grow up to 8mm wide.

Distribution 
This plant has been found in three distributed locations in French Guiana, and is expected to grow more widely than its current known locations.

References

attenuata
Tropical fruit
Flora of South America
Endemic flora of French Guiana
Fruits originating in South America
Fruit trees
Berries
Plants described in 2015